Antonio Cruz (born April 23, 1977), known professionally as Tony Sunshine, is an American R&B singer of Puerto Rican descent, famous for his affiliation with New York City hip hop group Terror Squad. He sang on tracks such as Cuban Link's "Still Telling Lies", Fat Joe's "All I Need" and Big Pun's "100%". He released his debut single on Jive Records entitled "Oh My God" (featuring Diddy and Dirtbag) in 2004.

Biography
Raised in the Bronx, Cruz was taken in at the age of 13 by Fat Joe, who attempted to secure a recording contract for the teen. Cruz then took the name Tony Sunshine, and eventually became a member of Terror Squad. Fat Joe, also a Terror Squad member, said he respected and understood Cruz’s unique talent. Cruz would eventually collaborate with R. Kelly, Ginuwine, T-Pain, Fabolous and Capone-N-Noreaga.

Music
Tony Sunshine has sung vocals for Big Pun on songs like "100%", "Laughin at You", and "My Dick". He has also appeared on some of Fat Joe's songs including "TS Piece", and "All I need". Terror Squad's debut album entitled Terror Squad was released in 1999, Tony Sunshine appears on several songs on that album also.
Tony Sunshine working with music producer Aytekin Storch,

Fat Joe was able to finalize a record deal for Tony in 2005 with Epic and Sony BMG. Tony Sunshine was released from Sony BMG in May, 2006 and was signed to Urban Box Office.  In November 2006, UBO folded, leaving the future of Tony Sunshine's 2007 debut release uncertain. Tony released "She's Like The Wind", that featured fellow New York artist Lumidee. There is an English version and a Spanglish version.

In 2010, Tony was signed to Jive Records and is preparing his first full-length album with productions from Swizz Beatz and T-Pain. 
His first single "Say Hey" was released in July 2010 and was produced by Swizz Beatz.

Fast Forward to 2015, Tony has just released his new comeback mixtape where he skillfully blended R&B and Hiphop. Working with different producers and exploring his sound, his new mixtape "No Filter" has gotten acclaimed reviews on blogs, and online print. It is rumored that Tony is now working on a brand new LP with original material.

In 2016, Tony Sunshine reunited with Fat Joe and the Terror Squad. Tony Sunshine is working on a solo EP scheduled for release in late 2017, as well as highly anticipated joint ventures.

Discography
2016: Danger
2016: Close
2018: TBA

Singles
2000: “100%” Big Pun (featuring Tony Sunshine) 
2003: "Grey Goose" (featuring Fat Joe)
2003: “All I need” Fat Joe (featuring Tony Sunshine and Armageddon) 
2004: "Oh My God" (featuring Diddy & Dirtbag)
2007: "She's Like the Wind" (featuring Lumidee)
2010: "Say Hey"
2011: "#1 Baby"
2013: "Don't Deserve"
2015: "Crying"
2016: "Danger" (featuring Chris Rivers)
2017: "Talk About it"
2018: "Take Me Away"
2019: "Bruce Leroy"
2019: "Shots Fired"
2020: "Wandas Son" (Featuring Dre of Cool N Dre)
2021: "You Said"

Mixtapes
2015: No Filter

References

External links
Official Instagram Page
Tony Sunshine Official Home

American contemporary R&B singers
Terror Squad (group) members
People from the Bronx
Rappers from the Bronx
Living people
1977 births
21st-century American rappers
21st-century American singers